Charles Timothy Brooks (June 20, 1813 – June 14, 1883) was a noted American translator of German works, a poet, a transcendentalist and a Unitarian pastor.

Biography
Charles Timothy Brooks was born in Salem, Massachusetts on June 20, 1813. He graduated at Harvard in 1832, then studied theology and in 1835 began to preach in Nahant, Massachusetts.

He married Harriet Lyman Hazard in October 1837, and they had four children.

He served as a preacher in various New England towns until he became pastor of the Unitarian church in Newport, Rhode Island on June 4, 1837, where he remained until his death on June 14, 1883.

In addition to his translations, he published theological writings, contributed to The Dial, a transcendentalist publication, and wrote a biography of William Ellery Channing, another Unitarian minister in Newport, Rhode Island (William Ellery Channing: A Centennial Memory, 1880).

Works

German translations into English
 Schiller's William Tell (Providence, 1838)
 Songs and Ballads from the German, forming one volume of George 
 Ripley's Specimens of Foreign Standard Literature (Boston, 1842) 
 Schiller's Homage of the Arts (Boston, 1847; 2d ed., New York, 1870);
 German Lyrics (Boston, 1853);
 Goethe's Faust in the original metres (1856)
 Life, Opinions, Actions, and Fate of Hieronymus Jobs, the Candidate, a satirical poem, popular in Germany (Philadelphia, 1863)
 Richter's Titan, The Invisible Lodge, and Hesperus (1865)
 Schefer's "Layman's Breviary" (1867) and "World-Priest" (1873)
 Ruckert's "Wisdom of the Brahmin (Boston, 1882)
 several children's books

Poetry
 Aquidneck, a poem delivered at the 100th anniversary of the Redwood library (Newport, 1848) 
 Songs of Field and Flood, a volume of poems (Boston, 1854) 
 numerous occasional verses
 A collection of his poems, original and translated, with a memoir by Charles W. Wendte, was published in Boston after his death.

Other works
 "The Controversy touching the Old Stone Mill," opposing the theory that it was built by the Northmen (Newport, 1851); 
 William Ellery Channing, A Centennial Memory (Boston, 1880) 
 a volume of sermons

According to Appleton's Encyclopedia, several of Brooks' works were unpublished years after his death:

References

External links
 
 
 Aquidneck (64 pages) by Charles Timothy Brooks, (scroll down the page for links to individual pages of the book)

American Unitarians
Harvard University alumni
1813 births
1883 deaths
19th-century American poets
American male poets
19th-century American translators
19th-century American male writers
Translators of Johann Wolfgang von Goethe